Quşqara is a village and municipality in the Goygol Rayon of Azerbaijan.  It has a population of 1895.  The municipality consists of the villages of Quşqara, Bəhrəmbağ, and Səmədli.

References 

Populated places in Goygol District